The Tecomazuchil Formation is a geologic formation in Oaxaca, Mexico. It is made up of "a basal conglomerate 135 m thick and predominantly composed of quartz and metamorphic rock fragments, overlain by about 600 m of interbedded tan to red conglomerates, sandstones, and siltstones. The Tecomazuchil Formation overlies unconformably the Acatlán Complex and has been assigned a Middle Jurassic age, though it could represent at least part of the Oxfordian." Fossil Bennettitales have been found in the formation.

See also

 List of fossiliferous stratigraphic units in Mexico

References

External links
 "Fossilworks: Gateway to the Paleobiology Database"
 "Mesozoic Sedimentary and Tectonic History of North-central Mexico", Issue 340
 Paleomagnetic study of Jurassic and Cretaceous rocks from the Mixteca terrane (Mexico)
 A new species of Weltrichia (Bennettitales) from the Middle Jurassic of the Tecomazuchil Formation (Oaxaca, Mexico)
 Magnetostratigraphy of a Middle Jurassic red bed sequence from southern Mexico

Jurassic Mexico
Callovian Stage
Jurassic System of North America